FC Robo Queens is a women's association football club based in Mushin Lagos State, Nigeria and a member of the Nigerian Women Football League (NWFL) and have competed in the Nigeria Women Premier League, the highest division for women association football in the country.

Through FC Robo Queens, the club has contributed immensely to the women’s game in Nigeria, Africa and the world at large having produced several talented players for the Nigerian national team and a host of professional women clubs across the globe. BBC and Two-time African footballer of the year, Asisat Oshoala, along with Esther Sunday, Rasheedat Ajibade, Aminat Yakubu are all products of the club's academy program and youth program.

Asisat Oshoala is also an ambassador of the club in 2016, a move to help uplift the business brand and image of the club.

History 
FC Robo International, owners of FC Robo Queens is a privately owned professional football club from Lagos, Nigeria. Founded on the 19th of April, Osahon Emmanuel Orobosa, a veteran of the Nigerian football league, primarily as a football academy for boys but soon expanded to accommodate girls/women program, a decision which has since proven to be very positive for the club as her current popularity and growing-base (Nationally and Internationally) is largely due to the successful exploits of her female team (FC Robo Queens).

2022 Squad List  
<small>Squad list for 2022.

Notable former players 
 Asisat Oshoala
 Rasheedat Ajibade
 Esther Sunday

References 

Football clubs in Lagos
Women's football clubs in Nigeria
Association football clubs established in 1999
Nigeria Women Premier League clubs
1999 establishments in Nigeria
NWFL Premiership clubs